The Antlers Cafe and Bar in Yampa, Colorado, was built around 1903–04.  It was listed on the National Register of Historic Places in 2014.

History 
It was a saloon before and after Prohibition, and was a pool hall reputedly with illegal alcohol during.

References

External links

National Register of Historic Places in Routt County, Colorado
Buildings and structures completed in 1904